Çanakkale Onsekiz Mart University (informally ÇOMÜ) is a Turkish public research university located in Çanakkale (Dardannelles) province (near Gallipoli) and its surrounding towns. It is a member of the Balkan Universities Network, the European University Association (EUA), International Association of Universities (IAU), and the Thrace Universities Union. It hosted the World Universities Congress in 2010.

The ÇOMÜ is listed among the world's top 1,000 best universities in the 2012 annual Scimago Institutions Rankings World Reports and one of the top innovative universities in Turkey The university was named as one of the top innovative Turkish universities in 2013 by the Turkish Ministry of Science, Industry and Technology.

History

Thrace University Period 
Some of the COMU colleges were part of the Trakya (Thrace) University before 1992. The Faculty of Education is rooted in the 1950s. The Çanakkale Vocational School was also part of the Thrace University (Edirne).

Foundation 
The ÇOMÜ was founded in 1992 based upon the Faculty of Education on the Anafartalar Campus by the Turkish Parliament law. Before this the facilities had housed a teacher training institute that was a branch of Trakya University. The first rector of the university was Prof. Dr. Mete Tuncoku.

With its new status and intake from Turkey's large youth population, the university developed quickly in terms of the number of students, staff and facilities, spurring the opening of new faculties and colleges.

The university has expanded over the last few years and in the 2005–2006 academic year there were over 19,000 students participating in a variety of programs taught by 960 academic staff in two graduate schools, nine faculties, two polytechnic colleges (four-year programs) and 11 vocational colleges (two-year programs). There are several campuses in Chanakkale itself, and some of the academic units are located in other towns of the province.

The number of academicians in the COMU is over 1800 and the student number is over 48.610 in 2020.

Web site https://global.comu.edu.tr

Rector of our university Prof. Dr. Sedat MURAT

Academics
As of 2020, ÇOMÜ has approximately 48,800 students, of which 30,100 are enrolled in undergraduate programs, 13,600 in 2-years programs, and about 3,600 in MA and PhD programs. Each academic year, the ÇOMÜ hosts over 2000 regular international students from 68 different countries. 
As of 2020, the number of academical personnel is 1920. The total number of personnel reaches 3,000. 
The number of the alumni exceeds 112,000. The languages of instructions at ÇOMÜ are Turkish and English.

Faculties

 Biga Faculty of Economics and Administrative Sciences
 Faculty of Agriculture
 Faculty of Education
 Faculty of Engineering
 Faculty of Fine Arts
 Faculty of Marine Sciences and Technologies
 Faculty of Medicine
 Faculty of Sciences and Arts
 Faculty of Theology
 Faculty of Communication
 Faculty of Political Sciences in Çanakkale
 Faculty of Architecture and Design

Biga Faculty of Economics and Administrative Sciences, BIIBF
The Biga Faculty of Economics and Managements Studies is located in Biga, a town approximately 70 kilometers from the Canakkale city center. It offers courses at undergraduate and postgraduate levels.

The faculty publishes a quarterly journal: Journal of Administrative Sciences (YBD).

The departments are International Relations, Business Studies, Economics, Labor economics & Industrial Relations, Public Finance, Public Management.
 Dean: Prof. Dr. Ercan SARIDOĞAN
 Deputy Dean: Prof. Dr. Sedat MURAT
 Department of International Relations: Prof. Dr. Mete Tunçoku (Asia-Pacific), Prof. Dr. Yucel Acer (International Law); Assoc. Prof. Dr. Mehmet HASGULER (Cyprus), Assist. Prof. Dr. Bulent Uludağ (Caucasus), Assoc. Prof. Dr. Soner Karagül (International Relations), Asst. Prof. Dr. Bestami Sadi Bilgiç (Political History), Assist. Prof. Dr. Dr. Gurol BABA (Australia and Pacific), Assist. Prof. Dr. Ruhi Güler (International Politics).
 Department of Administrative Studies: Prof. Dr. Hamit Palabıyık (Urbanisation and Public Administration), Prof. Dr. Ibrahim Kaya (Sea Law), Assist. Prof. Kutay Üstün (Political Sciences), Assist. Prof. Dr. Assiye Aka (Political Sciences), Assist. Prof. Dr. Hikmet Yavaş (Law and Politics).
 Department of Labour Studies: Asst. Prof. Dr. Mahir Gümüş
 Web:

Faculty of Agriculture
The Faculty of Agriculture is located on the main Terzioglu Campus in Canakkale and has practical training facilities at its farm in the village of Saricaali (TETAM) and on the Dardanos Campus.

The departments are Agricultural Economics, Agricultural Construction and Irrigation, Agricultural Mechanisation, Animal Science, Field Crops, Horticulture, Landscaping, Plant Protection, Soil Science.

Faculty of Education
This is the largest faculty of the university, with approximately 4,500 students, and is on the Anafartalar Campus in the centre of Çanakkale. Departments are Computer and Educational Technology Teaching, Education Studies, Fine Arts Teaching, Foreign Language Teaching, Physical Education and Sports Teaching, Primary School Teaching, Secondary Education Social Subjects Teaching, Turkish Language Teaching.

Faculty of Engineering 

The Faculty of Engineering and Architecture is temporarily located in the Faculty of Sciences and Arts building on the Terzioglu Campus, until its own building is complete. Departments are Geomatics Engineering, Computer Engineering, Food Engineering, Geological Engineering, Geophysical Engineering and Environmental Engineering.

Faculty of Fine Arts
The Faculty of Fine Arts is housed in the buildings of Faculty of Agriculture, Faculty of Theology, Canakkale Vocational College. Nedime Hanim Friendship House is the nest for the departments of Textile, Performing and Visual Arts and Cinema and Television.

Departments are Ceramics, Cinema and Television, Performing and Visual Arts, Graphics, Painting, Photography, Sculpture, Textiles, Traditional Handicrafts.

Faculty of Marine Sciences and Technologies
The Faculty of Marine Science and Technologies was temporarily housed in the Faculty of Sciences and Arts building until the construction of its own building on the Terzioglu Campus. Its first name was Fisheries Faculty which founded in 1992 and started its academic program in 1995. It offers courses at undergraduate and postgraduate levels. It has several research facilities and laboratories for fisheries and aquatic research that encompasses a broad range of topics such as: aquaculture, water chemistry and pollution, fish diseases, biotechnology and genetics, seafood processing and quality, limnology and marine biology, and fisheries biology.

Departments are Aquaculture, Fishing and Processing, Hydrobiology.

Faculty of Medicine
The Faculty of Medicine received its first intake of students in 2002 and at present they are being educated at another university in Istanbul. Since 2007 students are educated in the Faculty of Medicine building in the main campus, Çanakkale.

The school has 320 students in 2012.

Faculty of Sciences and Arts
The Faculty of Sciences and Arts is on the Terzioglu Campus. Its departments are Archaeology, Art History, Sociology, Biology, Chemistry, English Language and Literature, Geography, History, Mathematics, Physics, Turkish Language and Literature.

The astronomical observatory ÇOMÜ Ulupınar Observatory, established in 2002, is run by the faculty.

Faculty of Theology
The ÇOMÜ Faculty of Theology is in its own building on the Terzioglu Campus. It offers undergraduate and postgraduate programmes to train students who will be able to offer their services to the community as Islamic clergymen or scholars or teachers of religious subjects in schools. Students who elect to study appropriate optional courses can also find employment in state archives or similar institutions.

Importance is also given to academic undertakings. Members of the faculty have organized national and international conferences and panel discussions, participated in interdisciplinary and regional projects (one of these funded by the Turkish Academy of Sciences), and presented papers at national and overseas conferences. Results of research undertakings are presented in publications and information about religious subjects given to the general public through participation in TV programmes and the like.

Departments are Basic Islamic Studies, Islamic History and Art, Philosophy and Religious Studies.

Faculty of Communication 
Founded in 2011. It is one of latest faculties of the university with 320 students.

Faculty of Political Sciences in Çanakkale 
Founded as "Faculty of Economics and Administrative Sciences" in 2012, began its first year with 11 departments (Political Science and Public Administration, Department of Economics, Department of Business Administration, Department of International Relations, Labour Economics and Industrial relations Department, Finance Department, Health Administration, Department of Social Services, Department of Econometrics, International Trade and Finance Department and the Management Information Systems Department).

Faculty's International Relations Department received its first students in the 2018–2019 academic year, on a 100% English program. As of the 2019–2020 academic year, our Business Administration department continued its education in 30% English. In addition, departments of "International Management", "Local Governments, "Urban and Environmental Policies" were established at the faculty as master programs with opened thesis and education started. Since the 2019–2020 academic year, graduate students have also been admitted to the Department of Management and Organization.

As of 2020/2021 over 2000 undergraduate students attend this faculty at various departments. Increasing both the undergraduate and graduate education capacity of our faculty and the supply of qualified academic staff are carried out with a focus on quality.

Faculty of Architecture and Design 
It was part of the Faculty of the Engineering and Architecture. It became a separate faculty with the Governmental Chart in 2012 February.

Institutes

Institute of Social Sciences 
Offers MA and PhD degrees in international relations, political sciences, Middle East, labour relations, Turkish literature, sociology, theology, Balkans studies, management, economics. Established in 1995.

Institute of Science 
Offers MA and PhD degrees in chemistry, marine sciences, geography, physics, astronomy, biology, engineering. Established in 1995.

Institute of Education 
MA and PhD degrees in education established in 2011. It was part of the Institute of Social Sciences before 2011.

Çanakkale Onsekiz Mart University Institute of Education or ÇOMÜ Graduate School of Educational Sciences was established in 2010 to conduct graduate education (Master's and Doctorate) as well as scientific research and practice in areas related to educational sciences. 
The Graduate School began operations with 4 PhD and 14 MA degrees that were transferred from the Graduate Schools of Social Sciences and of Natural and Applied Sciences in the Autumn Semester of the 2011–2012 academic year.

Institute of Medical Sciences 
Çanakkale Onsekiz Mart University Graduate School of Health Sciences or the ÇOMÜ Institute of Medical Sciences was founded in 2010 and began education and training activities in 2011 with the Department of Physical Education and Sports Teaching.

The Graduate School is engaged in efforts to open MSc and PhD programmes in the Faculty of Medicine, School of Health and School of Physical Education and Sports Teaching. It is also planned that graduates from the Departments of Dentistry, Pharmacy, Veterinary Medicine and Biology will be enrolled in these programmes for MSc and PhD degrees.

Other Schools 
The following 4-year schools are also part of the university.
 School of Tourism
 School of Sports
 School of Foreign Languages
 School of Health
 School of Applied Sciences (Biga)
 Gökçeada School of Applied Sciences
 School of Applied Sciences in Çan

Vocational Schools 
The following schools are 2-year colleges:
 Çanakkale Vocational School of Social Sciences
 Çanakkale Vocational School of Technical Sciences
 Çanakkale Vocational School of Marine Technologies
 Biga Vocational School
 Gelibolu Vocational School (Gallipoli)
 Lapseki Vocational School
 Yenice Vocational School
 Çan Vocational School
 Ayvacık Vocational School
 Bayramiç Vocational School
 Ezine Vocational School
 Gökçeada Vocational School
 Bozcada Vocational School Branch
 Eceabat Vocational School Branch

Campuses 
 Terzioğlu Campus (Main Campus, Southern Çanakkale)
 Anafartalar Campus (Faculty of Education etc., City centre)
 Dardanos Campus (Dardanelles town)
 Ulupinar Campus (Observatory)
 İskele (Peer) Campus (Old Rectorate)
 Biga Ağaköy Campus (Biga) & Biga Campus 2
 Gökçeada Campus
 Çan Campus
 Gelibolu Campus (Gallipoli)
 Ezine Campus
 Yenice Campus
 Bayramiç Campus
 Lapseki Campus
 Ayvacık Campus
 Kepez Medical Campus
 Eceabat Campus
 Hamzakoy Campus (Gallipoli)
 Bozcada Campus

Main Campus (Terzioğlu) 
Main campus (Terzioğlu Campus) is located in between Çanakkale and Kepez on the upper bank of the Bursa-İzmir highway. The campus is also known as the Terzioğlu Campus or Terzioğlu Hill.

In this campus, the following schools are located: The Senate House, Rectorate (A and B Blocks), Faculty of Medicine, Faculty of Agriculture, Faculty of Marine Sciences and Technologies, Faculty of Engineering, Faculty of Arts and Sciences, Faculty of Political Sciences, Institute of Social Sciences, Institute of Medical Sciences, Institute of Science, School of Health, School of Foreign Languages, Vocational School of Social and Technical Sciences, School of Sports and Sports Halls, Faculty of Fine Arts, Faculty of Divinity, Faculty of Communication and Journalism, the Main Library (ÇOMÜ Library), social areas, student accommodation offices and dormitories, Student Union, mosque, University Radio etc.

The Anafartalar Campus
The Anafartalar Campus is the founding campus of ÇOMÜ. It is located in the Cevatpaşa District. The Faculty of Education, The Institute of Education, Süleyman Demirel Conference Hall and the ÇOMÜ Sport Hall are housed here.

The Dardanos Campus 
The Dardanos Campus is located in Dardanos (Dardanelles) historical town. The campus includes social sites, swimming poll, application hotel of the university, restaurants, football pitch, sports hall, tennis court, university beach, sailing clup, agriculture gardens, accommodation area, playing grounds etc. The campus is about 8 km to the city centre.

The Kepez Campus 
It is located in Kepez town. The campus is the house of the Medicine School Hospital and related medical research facilities.

The Ulupınar Campus 
The Ulupınar Campus is situated close to the Ulupınar village about 10 km to the Terzioğlu Main Campus of the university and is home to the Ulupınar Observatory and Space Research Centre.

The University Library
ÇOMÜ's library facilities are spread across its three campuses. The collections encompass over 520,000 printed books, as well as thousands of journals and electronic resources.

The ÇOMÜ Library or the main research library of the University of Çanakkale Onsekiz Mart, is one of the oldest libraries in Southern Marmara, Turkey and the first in size in the Southern and the Western Marmara region. The library is at the centre of the main campus and owns a collection of 690,000 books (520,000 of them are printed). The ÇOMÜ Library is a 7/24 library, open 365 days a year including holidays.

Main Library in Terzioğlu Campus 
The Main Library is ÇOMÜ's largest library and is housed in the Terzioğlu Campus near the Rectorate Building. It is home to the books and journals of the Schools of Letter and Sciences, Engineering, Marine Sciences, Administrative and Political Sciences, Divinity, Arts, Humanities. It also houses the Special Collections and rare books.

Other libraries 
The Biga Library in Ağaköy Campus houses a collection of over 60,000 printed works as well as thousands of slides, sound recordings and some manuscript material.
The Anafartalar Library in Anafartalar Campus houses a collection of over 5,000 books on education.
College libraries: Each college and schools in the towns also have their own libraries.

International Relations Office
The ÇOMÜ International Relations Office coordinates activities with an international dimension; assists incoming/outgoing students and staff with all necessary procedures and provides support during the preparation and administration of the projects. The ÇOMÜ International Relations Office offers support for students and staff in several areas:

EU Erasmus Programme
The Erasmus Programme in ÇOMÜ aims to improve the quality of higher education by encouraging cooperation between participating countries. Çanakkale Onsekiz Mart University has been participating in Erasmus Mobility Programmes (student & staff exchange) since 2004.

EU Youth Programme
The main aim in this programme is to provide students with an opportunity to participate in international social responsibility projects and in the EVS (European Volunteer Service) programme.

EU Leonardo da Vinci Programme
Leonardo mobility and pilot projects have been carried out at COMU since 2004. The ÇOMÜ academic staff have also taken part in research or other multinational projects intended to stimulate innovation and to enhance the quality of training and vocational guidance.

EU Comenius Programme
Several projects have been carried out and students participate in the "Comenius Teaching Assistant" scheme. In addition, members of the university have been involved in multilateral projects and several Comenius-Grundtvig in-service training programmes have been held.

EU Grundtvig Programme
The programme funds a range of activities, particularly those enabling staff in adult education to travel abroad for learning experiences, through participation in exchanges and various other professional experiences. Canakkale Onsekiz Mart University has participated in several Grundtvig projects.

International Cooperation Agreements
COMU is aware of the importance of encouraging, developing and supporting educational, cultural and scientific cooperation with overseas higher education institutions and has been successful in developing and implementing cooperation agreements with an increasing number of universities abroad.

International Research Support
The main aim is to provide information about available international research funds. In addition, seminars and workshops on project preparation are organized to inform academic staff about related opportunities and support them in their applications.

Student life

Student body
For the 2020–21 academic year, ÇOMÜ had a total full-time student body of 48,772.

30,073 undergraduate students (13,602 out of them are on two-years programs) and 5,098 postgraduates.
Students currently come from 68 countries around the world and study a wide range of subjects.

Imperial's male:female ratio for undergraduate students is almost 1:1 ratio.

ÇOMÜ Student Union
ÇOMÜ Student Union or Student Council is part of the ÇOMÜ Senato and the head of the council is elected by the ÇOMÜ students.

Facilities
Sports facilities at Çanakkale city campuses include three gyms, one swimming pool and three sports halls. The university has its own beach in the Dardanelles Campus 6 km from the Main Campus. The Dardanelles Campus has a football pitch, a tennis court, two basketball court a sports hall.

Student Media

Kampüs FM

ÇOMÜ Kampüs FM was founded in March 2012. 94:00 FM

ÇOMÜ FM

ÇOMÜ FM is an internet radio and run by the university students.

Student organizations
Students at the University of Çanakkale Onsekiz Mart run over 220 clubs and organizations. These include social, athletic, cultural and religious groups, academic clubs and teams, and common-interest organizations.

See also 

 COMU Hospital, affiliated research and teaching hospital

References

External links

 Turkish Universities, State and Private. From USAK Pages

 
Educational institutions established in 1992
Çanakkale
Buildings and structures in Çanakkale Province
1992 establishments in Turkey